Cascade Lake is an Intel codename for a 14 nm server, workstation and enthusiast processor microarchitecture, launched in April 2019. In Intel's Process-Architecture-Optimization model, Cascade Lake is an optimization of Skylake. Intel states that this will be their first microarchitecture to support 3D XPoint-based memory modules. It also features Deep Learning Boost instructions and mitigations for Meltdown and Spectre. Intel officially launched new Xeon Scalable SKUs on February 24, 2020.

Variants
Server: Cascade Lake-SP, Cascade Lake-AP
Workstation: Cascade Lake-W
Enthusiast: Cascade Lake-X

List of Cascade Lake processors

Cascade Lake-X (Enthusiast)

Cascade Lake-AP (Advanced Performance)
Cascade Lake-AP is branded as Xeon Platinum 9200 series and all SKUs are soldered to the motherboard. These CPUs will not work with Optane Memory.

Xeon Platinum 9200 Series

Cascade Lake-SP (Scalable)

Xeon Platinum series

Xeon Gold 6200 series 
Bolded denotes new SKUs released February 24, 2020.

Xeon Gold 5200 Series 
Bolded denotes new SKUs released February 24, 2020.

Xeon Silver series 
Bolded denotes new SKUs released February 24, 2020.

Xeon Bronze series 
Bolded denotes new SKUs released February 24, 2020.

Cascade Lake-W (Workstation)

Xeon W-2200 series

Xeon W-3200 series

References

Skylake microarchitecture
Intel microarchitectures
Transactional memory
X86 microarchitectures